Saraiki cuisine refers to the native cuisine of the Saraiki people in central Pakistan. The style of cooking is present in the Saraiki-speaking region of southern Punjab, as well as parts of southern Khyber Pakhtunkhwa, northern Sindh and northeastern Balochistan. Saraiki food comprises many unique local dishes, and also shares influences with neighbouring regional cuisines. The metropolitan city of Multan is a hub of Saraiki cooking.

Dishes
Mango is a seasonal fruit of the region during summers.

Sohan halwa is a traditional speciality of southern Punjab, particularly Multan. It is a halwa dessert that is prepared by boiling a mixture of water, sugar, milk and cornflour until solidified. Saffron is used for flavoring while ghee is used to prevent it from sticking to the pan. Almonds, pistachios and cardamom seeds are added as additives. The southern Punjab cities of Dera Ghazi Khan, Bahawalpur, Uch Sharif and Mailsi are also known for their sohan halwa products.

Multani Chaamp is a meat dish consisting of lamb chops prepared with various flavours and spices, placed on sewers and grilled over charcoal.
Sohbat is a food of saraiki belt of Khyber Pakhtunkhwa, Pakistan and Saraiki belt of Punjab, Pakistan. It is the traditional dish of Damaan and other Saraiki belt of DI Khan, Tank, Bhakkar, Layyah, Mianwali, Taunsa Sharif, Vehoa, and DG Khan.

Gallery

See also
Saraikistan
Saraiki people 
List of Saraiki people
Saraiki culture
Saraiki literature
Saraiki diaspora

References

Pakistani cuisine